Anderson Manor (former James Anderson House, currently Anderson Manor Family Hospice and Palliative Care) located at 1423 Liverpool Street in the Manchester neighborhood of Pittsburgh, Pennsylvania, was built circa 1830 (additions were added to the house in 1905).  Colonel James Anderson, who lived at this house, was the man from whom Andrew Carnegie (1835–1919) borrowed books during his formative years.  Anderson opened his personal library of 400 volumes to working boys each Saturday night, and helped start the first library in the area.  The house was added to the List of Pittsburgh History and Landmarks Foundation Historic Landmarks in 1989.

References

Houses in Pittsburgh
Houses completed in 1830
1830 establishments in Pennsylvania
Pittsburgh History & Landmarks Foundation Historic Landmarks